Bartholomew Burton ( – 1770) was a British financier, banker and politician who sat in the House of Commons from 1759 to 1768. He was Governor of the Bank of England from 1760 to 1762.

Burton was the fourth son of Bartholomew Burton of North Luffenham, Rutland, and his second wife Susanna Gregory, daughter of George Gregory. He married Hester Mansell in 1729. She died and he married secondly on 2 September 1733, Philadelphia Herne, daughter of Nathaniel Herne, MP, and had one daughter. His wife died on 23 April 1762 and he married a third time to Elizabeth Marke, daughter of John Marke.

Burton was a director of the Bank of England from 1746 to 1758 when he became Deputy Governor. He was brought into parliament at a time of financial crisis as Member of Parliament for Camelford at a by-election on 25 May 1759. He became Governor of the Bank of England in 1760. Burton's tenure as Governor occurred during the Bengal bubble (1757–1769). At the 1761 general election he was returned unopposed again as MP for Camelford. He decided not to stand at the 1768 general election.

Burton died in May 1770. He was the brother of William Burton who was also an MP.

See also
Chief Cashier of the Bank of England

References 

Governors of the Bank of England
1690s births
1770 deaths
Members of the Parliament of Great Britain for English constituencies
British MPs 1754–1761
British MPs 1761–1768
British bankers
Deputy Governors of the Bank of England